Lolley is a surname. Notable people with the surname include:

Joe Lolley (born 1992), English association football player
Larry Lolley (1947–2018), American judge
Phillip Lolley (born 1954), American football player and coach

English-language surnames